Baghestan Rural District is in Eslamiyeh District of Ferdows County, South Khorasan province, Iran. At the National Census of 2006, its population was 5,395 in 1,861 households, when it was in the Central District. There were 5,361 inhabitants in 1,903 households at the following census of 2011. At the most recent census of 2016, the population of the rural district was 5,438 in 1,863 households. The largest of its 58 villages was Baghestan, with 2,704 people.

After the census, Eslamiyeh District was established by combining Baghestan Rural District, Borun Rural District, and the city of Eslamiyeh. At the same time, Baghestan-e Olya's name changed to Baghestan and was raised to the level of a city. Baghestan-e Sofla became the new capital of Baghestan Rural District.

References 

Ferdows County

Rural Districts of South Khorasan Province

Populated places in South Khorasan Province

Populated places in Ferdows County